Simon John Wolstencroft (born 19 January 1963 in Altrincham, Cheshire) is an English rock drummer, best known for playing with The Fall from 1986 to 1997. He also played with early incarnations of The Smiths and The Stone Roses. His highly praised autobiography You Can Drum But You Can't Hide was published in 2014.

The Stone Roses
Wolstencroft was a member of the Patrol, an early incarnation of the Stone Roses, with childhood friends Ian Brown and John Squire. He was also the drummer for Freak Party which featured Johnny Marr and Andy Rourke. In Songs That Saved Your Life, Marr states that Wolstencroft declined to join the then upcoming the Smiths as he did not like Morrissey's voice. In his subsequent memoir Set The Boy Free, Marr states that Morrissey was reluctant to take on drummer Mike Joyce as he was still hankering after having Wolstencroft in the band. Wolstencroft returned briefly to play with Ian Brown and John Squire in the nascent Stone Roses before taking a short-lived stint with Terry Hall's band the Colourfield.

The Fall
In 1985 Wolstencroft formed the Weeds with friend Andrew Berry and released the single 'China Doll' on the In Tape label. Wolstencroft reveals in his memoir that when the Weeds played support to The Fall at Harlesden Mean Fiddler, a blazing row between Mark E. Smith and Fall drummer Karl Burns led to Smith offering Wolstencroft the stool in the Fall.

Wolstencroft joined the Fall in time to play on most of the group's Bend Sinister album (on which he was credited as "John' S. Woolstencroft"), and remained in the band for over a decade, occasionally adding keyboards and programming to his role as well as co-writing the group's only self-penned Top 40 single, "Free Range", from their Code: Selfish album. He left the band following a dispute over the recording of the Levitate album.

Later career
In 1996, Wolstencroft had a daughter, Emily Wolstencroft. After this, he went on to reunite with Stone Roses singer Ian Brown, performing and co-writing on his Golden Greats album in 1999. He toured with Sheffield-based electronica outfit, I-Monster, followed by a stint with Jez Kerr of A Certain Ratio in the Family Bizarre before joining ex 808 State player Darren Partington's band, Big Unit. Wolstencroft made a guest appearance on drums for I, Ludicrous at the Polyfest festival and recorded an album playing drums for One Manc Banned.

In 2016, Wolstencroft recorded a session for Neville Staple on the 'Take Out The War' track with Juliette Ashby and worked with producer Mike Bennett on Stemz and a reworking of some early Freak Party recordings which incorporated Angie Brown on vocals and Craig Gannon on additional guitar. In the same year he made his acting debut in a video for the Tim Burgess & Peter Gordon song "Say" directed by Wolstencroft's nephew, Nico Mirallegro.

Wolstencroft started a new band the G-O-D with long-time friend Chris Bridgett (Dub Sex) in 2015. They released an EP 'Grafters Ov Denton' in 2017.

In November 2022 fellow ex-Fall member Martin Bramah announced a new collaboration with Simon - 'House Of All' which also features ex-Fall members Pete Greenway, Steve Hanley and his brother Paul. Their self-titled debut album will be released in April 2023 on the Tiny Global Productions label

You Can Drum But You Can't Hide
Wolstencroft's memoir You Can Drum But You Can't Hide was published by Strata Books in 2014 and an updated edition was published in 2017 by Route Publishing. The book is a comprehensive overview of his career in which he reveals a 30-year drug habit which he managed to keep secret from most of his colleagues and friends. He talked about the book at the 2014 and 2016 Louder Than Words literary festival and said that inspiration for writing his memoir came when a contestant on Mastermind correctly identified him as the original drummer of The Smiths.

Discography

With the Fall

Studio albums
 1986 Bend Sinister
 1988 The Frenz Experiment
 1988 I Am Kurious, Oranj
 1990 Extricate
 1991 Shift-Work
 1992 Code: Selfish
 1993 The Infotainment Scan
 1994 Middle Class Revolt
 1995 Cerebral Caustic
 1996 The Light User Syndrome
 1997 Levitate

Live albums
 1993 BBC Radio One Live in Concert
 1997 In the City
 1997 15 Ways to Leave Your Man, Live
 1998 Live Various Years
 1998 Nottingham 92
 2000 I Am as Pure as Oranj
 2000 Live in Cambridge 1988
 2003 The Idiot Joy Show
 2003 Live at the Phoenix Festival

Part studio, part live albums
 1989 Seminal Live
 1995 The Twenty Seven Points

Compilation albums
 1990 458489 A Sides
 1990 458489 B Sides
 1993 The Collection
 1994 Backdrop
 1998 Smile – It's The Best of the Fall
 1999 The Peel Sessions
 2003 Rebellious Jukebox
 2004 50,000 Fall Fans Can't Be Wrong – 39 Golden Greats
 2005 The Complete Peel Sessions 1978-2004
 2007 The Fall Box Set – 1976–2007

EPs
 1990 The Dredger EP
 1993 Kimble

Singles
 1986 "Living Too Late"
 1986 "Mr. Pharmacist"
 1986 "Hey! Luciani"
 1987 "There's a Ghost in My House"
 1987 "Hit the North"
 1988 "Victoria"
 1988 "Jerusalem"
 1989 "Cab It Up!"
 1990 "Telephone Thing"
 1990 "Popcorn Double Feature"
 1990 "White Lightning"
 1990 "High Tension Line"
 1992 "Free Range"
 1992 "Ed's Babe"
 1993 "Why Are People Grudgeful?"
 1993 "Behind the Counter"
 1994 "15 Ways"
 1996 "The Chiselers"

With Ian Brown

Studio album
 1999 Golden Greats

References

1963 births
Living people
English rock drummers
British male drummers
People educated at Altrincham Grammar School for Boys
Musicians from Manchester
The Fall (band) members